Leslie Francis Flintoff (5 October 1930 – 7 February 2019) was an Australian rules footballer who played with Richmond in the Victorian Football League (VFL).  

In 1954, Flintoff was captain-coach of Ganmain that lost the South West Football League (New South Wales) grand final to Ariah Park Mirrool.

He was the father of Olympic hurdler Debbie Flintoff-King. 

In 1987 he was an unsuccessful candidate on the National Party's Victorian Senate ticket.

Notes

External links 		
		
		
		
		
		
		
1930 births
2019 deaths
Australian rules footballers from Victoria (Australia)		
Richmond Football Club players